Sir John Southcote (1510/11–1585) was an English judge and politician.

Life
He was the second son of William Southcote and his wife Alice Tregonnell, and grandson of Nicholas Southcote of Chudleigh, Devon. He was a member of the Middle Temple, where he was autumn reader in 1556, and again on his call to the degree of serjeant-at-law, April 1559.

Southcote was made justice of the Queen's Bench on 10 February 1563. He sat with Chief-justice Sir Robert Catlin on the trial (9 February 1572) of Robert Hickford, a retainer of the Duke of Norfolk, indicted for adhering to the queen's enemies; and as assessor to the peers on the trial of Thomas Howard, 4th Duke of Norfolk. He took part in the conference of November–December 1577 on the legal method of dealing with recusants.

In May 1584 Southcote retired and was succeeded by John Clench. He died on 18 April 1585.

Family

With his wife Elizabeth, daughter of William Robins, alderman of London, Southcote had a son John and two daughters. His remains were interred in the church of Witham, Essex, near his seat.

While Southcote conformed to the Elizabethan settlement of the Church of England, his children were Catholic recusants. His son John is known to have attended mass. His daughter Ann(e) married Francis Curson of Waterperry: she sheltered John Gerard in the periods 1589–1595 and 1597–1605.

A descendant, George Southcote of Blyborough, Lincolnshire, became Sir George Southcote, 1st Baronet on 1 January 1662. The baronetcy became extinct in 1691. A great-great-grandson of the judge, Sir Edward Southcote of Witham Place, wrote a family memoir that was published in the 19th century. His descent was via John (died 1637), son of the judge, who married Magdalen Walgrave; their son Edward who married Elizabeth Seaborne; their son Sir John who married Elizabeth, daughter of Walter Aston, 2nd Lord Aston of Forfar. He himself married Juliana Tyrwhitt, daughter of Sir Philip Tyrwhitt, 4th Baronet.

Coat of arms

Notes

External links

Attribution

1585 deaths
English barristers
Serjeants-at-law (England)
People from Witham
16th-century English judges
English MPs 1553 (Mary I)
Year of birth uncertain
John